S.S.C. Napoli improved by three positions following the arrival of Diego Maradona at the club. The new #10 had been bought from FC Barcelona on a World record transfer fee, and he fulfilled expectations with 14 goals in his debut season, making him the third best scorer in the entire league. The teams' league performance, however, was only average, ending up eight of out 16 teams. The previous season had almost resulted in relegation, so Maradona's arrival certainly boosted the team well before its two scudetti.

Squad

Transfers

Winter

Competitions

Serie A

League table

Results by round

Matches

Topscorers
  Diego Maradona 14
  Daniel Bertoni 11
  Luigi Caffarelli 6

Coppa Italia

Group phase

Eightfinals

Statistics

Sources
 RSSSF - Italy 1984/85 (for stats)
 Italian Wikipedia (for squad)

References

S.S.C. Napoli seasons
Napoli